"The Violent Heart" is an American television play broadcast on February 6, 1958, as part of the second season of the CBS television series Playhouse 90. John Frankenheimer directed. Dana Wynter and Ben Gazzara starred.

Plot
Set on the Riviera, a young marquise buys a camera from a photographer. She returns to the studio to visit the photographer.

Cast
The following performers received screen credit for their performances:

 Dana Wynter - Catherin D'Alencon
 Ben Gazzara - Paul
 Charles Korvin as Edouard D'Alencon
 Pamela Brown - Baronesse von Heinrich
 Vivian Nathan - Annette
 William Roerick - the Hotel Manager
 Mimi Gibson - Celeste D'Alencon

Production
John Frankenheimer was the director and Martin Manulis the producer. It was originally broadcast on February 6, 1958. It was part of the second season of Playhouse 90, an anthology television series that was voted "the greatest television series of all time" in a 1970 poll of television editors.

The commercial sponsors were Kimberly-Clark (Delsey bathroom tissue and Kleenex tissues), Marlboro cigarettes, Bristol-Myers (Ban deodorant, Bufferin pain reliever, Vitalis hair tonic, and Ipan toothpaste), and the American Gas Association.

References

1958 television plays
1958 American television episodes
Playhouse 90 (season 2) episodes
Adaptations of works by Daphne du Maurier